Coral stone may refer to:
Calcium carbonate, secreted by corals
"Coral shaped stone" or staghorn stone, a form of kidney stone